Tennis at the 2017 Summer Deaflympics took place at the Samsun Tennis Club in Canik.

Medal summary

Medalists

References

External links
 Tennis

2017 Summer Deaflympics